Deyeuxia is a genus of  plants allied to the Poaceae family.

Around 110 species are described. It is primarily found the southern hemisphere.

References

Poaceae genera
Pooideae